Ethmia umbrimarginella is a moth in the family Depressariidae.

Distribution
It is found in southern Arizona and New Mexico in the United States.

Description
The ground color of the forewings is dark slate gray. The immediate costal edge is dirty white up to the distal one-fourth. The ground color of the hindwings is white, with a broad dark gray margin around the apical, terminal and dorsal areas. Adults have been recorded in February.

References

Moths described in 1907
umbrimarginella